The 1983 Football League Cup Final was a football match held on 26 March 1983 between League Cup holders Liverpool and first-time finalists Manchester United, who won the FA Cup later that year. Liverpool won the match 2–1; Norman Whiteside scored the opener for Manchester United, before Alan Kennedy equalised with 15 minutes to go. The winner was scored in the eighth minute of extra-time by Ronnie Whelan.

Had Manchester United won the League Cup as well as the FA Cup that year, they would have become the first team ever to have won the two competitions in the same season. Instead, Liverpool won their third successive League Cup, and the second of three successive League and League Cup Doubles.

The match was played at Wembley Stadium in front of approximately 100,000 spectators.

Liverpool manager Bob Paisley collected the trophy, as it was his last major final in charge of Liverpool.

Match details

External links
 Match details and Liverpool line-up
 Details of Paisley collecting the trophy 

1983
League Cup Final 1983
League Cup Final 1983
1982–83 Football League
Football League Cup Final
Football League Cup Final